An ejector seat or ejection seat is an aircraft emergency exit device.

Ejector Seat or ejection seat may also refer to:
Ejector Seat, UK game show
Ejector Seat Reservation, Swervedriver album
Reverse bungee, catapult bungee, or sling shot, a fairground thrill ride